Heinrich Vogt (October 5, 1890 – January 23, 1968) was a German astronomer.

Early life 

Heinrich Vogt was born on October 5, 1890 in Gau-Algesheim, Rhineland-Palatinate, Germany to  Philipp Vogt, a farmer, and his wife Margaretha.

Education 

In 1911, after graduating from high school in Mainz, Vogt enrolled at the University of Heidelberg to study astronomy, mathematics, and physics, where he was under the tutelage of Max Wolf. His studies were interrupted due to World War I, but he continued his scientific career and earned a PhD in 1919 with a dissertation on the topic "On the theory of Algol variables". In 1921, he completed a Habilitation on "Photometric studies and brightness measurements in the cluster h and χ Persei".

Work and academic appointments 

In 1926, Vogt was appointed as an associate professor at the University of Heidelberg as well as the chief observer at Heidelberg State Observatory. In 1929 he was appointed as a full professor at the University of Jena as well as director of Jena Observatory.

In 1931, he became a member of the Nazi Party and rose to become a Politischer Leiter and the Nazi Party's liaison at the university. In 1933, he became a member of the Sturmabteilung, the paramilitary branch of the Nazi Party, and rose to the rank of Obersturmführer.

Vogt became a full professor at the University of Heidelberg in 1933, succeeding Max Wolf. From 1933 to 1945 he was the director of Heidelberg State Observatory.

In 1945 he was dismissed from his position as director of the observatory, but retained his professorship until his retirement in 1957. He increased his teaching activities and began to write popular books on astronomy and cosmology.

Heinrich Vogt and Henry Norris Russell independently discovered the Vogt–Russell theorem.

On 9 December 1912 Vogt discovered an asteroid, 735 Marghanna, which he named in honor of his mother. The minor planet 1439 Vogtia, discovered by  astronomer Karl Reinmuth in 1937 was named after him.

Personal life 

Vogt married Margarete Braun and had a son and a daughter.

References 

1890 births
1968 deaths

20th-century German astronomers